The 1962–63 Coppa Italia, the 16th Coppa Italia, was an Italian Football Federation domestic cup competition won by Atalanta.

First round 

* Torino and Lucchese qualify after drawing of lots.

Intermediate round

Round of 16 

p=after penalty shoot-out

Quarter-finals

Semi-finals

Final

Top goalscorers

References
rsssf.com

Coppa Italia seasons
Coppa Italia, 1962–63
1962–63 domestic association football cups